This is a list of lieutenant generals in the Swedish Army since 1900. The grade of lieutenant general (or three-star general) is ordinarily the second-highest in the peacetime Army, ranking above major general and below general. The lieutenant general was originally the general's deputy (locum tenens) or closest man. The lieutenant general was usually the commander of a division.

Historically, during the 20th century, some major generals were promoted to lieutenant general, and some lieutenants general were promoted to full general in connection with their retirement and thus never served in their new rank.

List of lieutenant generals
Entries are indexed by the numerical order in which each officer was appointed to that rank while on active duty, or by an asterisk (*) if the officer did not serve in that rank while on active duty. Each entry lists the officer's name, date of rank, date the officer vacated the active-duty rank, number of years on active duty as lieutenant general (Yrs), positions held as lieutenant general, and other biographical notes.

See also
Generallöjtnant
List of Swedish Navy lieutenant generals
List of Swedish Air Force lieutenant generals

Footnotes

References

Notes

Print

Lists of Swedish military personnel
Swedish Army